Matsi may refer to several places in Estonia:

Matsi, Pärnu County, village in Varbla Parish, Pärnu County
Matsi, Võru County, village in Rõuge Parish, Võru County
Matsi, former name of Rõuge-Matsi, village in Rõuge Parish, Võru County